19 draws Championship and CONCACAF Gold Cup held in eight countries-members of CONCACAF, and two draws (1985 and 1989) had not host countries: In general, during the period 1963–2011 as part of the final tournament held 389 matches, which were held in 48 stadiums of 42 cities in 9 countries (of which 28 stadiums in 26 cities located in the US): information on the number of cities differ, as part of the cities located within the agglomerations of Los Angeles and New York.

Host countries

1991 CONCACAF Gold Cup
The 1991 CONCACAF Gold Cup was the first edition of the Gold Cup, the football (soccer) championship of North America, Central America and the Caribbean (CONCACAF). The tournament was held in the United States, in California cities Los Angeles and Pasadena.

United States

1993 CONCACAF Gold Cup
Mexico and the United States hosted the second edition of CONCACAF's premier men's football tournament. Mexico hosted Group B, a semi-final, the third place and Final at the Estadio Azteca. The United States hosted Group A and semi-final all played at the Cotton Bowl in Dallas.

Mexico

United States

1996 CONCACAF Gold Cup
For the third edition, the tournament went back to the United States and California; the games were hosted by Los Angeles, San Diego, and Anaheim.

United States

1998 CONCACAF Gold Cup
The 1998 CONCACAF Gold Cup was once again held in the United States, in Los Angeles, Miami, and Oakland.

United States

See also
CONCACAF Championship
CONCACAF Gold Cup

References

External links
 CONCACAF Gold Cup; CONCACAF Official Site, worldfootball.net arquivodosmundiais.com 
 North, Central American and Caribbean Continental Championships; RSSSF Archive 
 CONCACAF Championships and FIFA World Cup Qualifiers; RSSSF Archive 1, 2, 3, 4, 5

 
CONCACAF